Bielice  is a village in Pyrzyce County, West Pomeranian Voivodeship, in north-western Poland. It is the seat of the gmina (administrative district) called Gmina Bielice.

The village has a population of 560.

References

Bielice